Dynamo Moscow Bandy Club is a Russian Bandy club from Moscow which was founded in 1923.

The bandy team plays in the new Ice Palace Krylatskoye in the outskirts of Moscow. Krylatskoye has hosted both Bandy World Championships and World Speed Skating Championships.

Dynamo Moscow won the World Cup for the first time in 2006, defeating Zorky in the final. The 2006 domestic title was followed by another four consecutive Russian championship titles, until 2017, when they missed the championship play-off, only coming in at eighth place in the regular season league.

Honours

Domestic
 Russian Champions:
 Winners (22): 1936, 1951, 1952, 1961, 1963, 1964, 1965, 1967, 1969, 1970, 1972, 1973, 1975, 1976, 1978, 2006, 2007, 2008, 2009, 2010, 2012, 2013, 2020, 2022
 Runners-up (15): 1950, 1954, 1959, 1966, 1968, 1971, 1974, 1977, 1984, 1987, 1988, 2011, 2014, 2015, 2019, 2021
 Russian Cup:
 Winners (20): 1937, 1938, 1940, 1941, 1947, 1948, 1949, 1950, 1951, 1952, 1953, 1954, 1987, 2005, 2006, 2008, 2010 (played in 2011), 2011, 2012, 2019, 2020, 2021
 Runners-up (4): 1988, 1989, 1991, 2018

International
 World Cup:
 Winners (3): 2006, 2007, 2013
 Runners-up (1): 1987
 European Cup:
 Winners (6): 1975, 1976, 1978, 2006, 2008, 2009
 Runners-up (1): 2007
 Edsbyn Champions Cup:
 Winners (4): 2006, 2008, 2013, 2015
 Runners-up (2): 2010, 2014

References

External links
 Official website 
 Video from the European Cup triumph in 2009
 Video from the title of the Russian Championships in 2012

Bandy clubs in Russia
Bandy clubs in the Soviet Union
Bandy
Bandy clubs established in 1923
1923 establishments in Russia